Karl Brian Smith (born 23 September 1978) is a former English cricketer.  Smith was a right-handed batsman who bowled right-arm medium pace.  He was born at Leicester, Leicestershire.

Smith represented the Leicestershire Cricket Board in a single List A match against the Warwickshire Cricket Board in the 2001 Cheltenham & Gloucester Trophy.  In his only List A match he scored 8 runs.

References

External links
Karl Smith at Cricinfo
Karl Smith at CricketArchive

1978 births
Living people
Cricketers from Leicester
English cricketers
Leicestershire Cricket Board cricketers